HMS Keppel was a Thornycroft type flotilla leader built for the Royal Navy at the end of the First World War.  She was completed too late to serve in that conflict, but saw extensive service in the inter war years and in World War II. She was an effective convoy escort and U-boat killer, being credited with the destruction of five U-boats during the Battle of the Atlantic.  She was the second of three ships named for 18th century Admiral Augustus Keppel.

Construction
Keppel was one of five ships of this class built as flotilla leaders by J I Thornycroft of Woolston, Hampshire to their own design. In this she was similar to the Admiralty's destroyer leader type, but built with features specific to Thornycroft's design principles. Keppel was ordered in April 1918 and laid down in October that year, but the war ended shortly after and work slowed with the advent of peace. Keppel was launched in April 1920 and moved to the Royal Navy Dockyard at Portsmouth, and later to Pembroke Dockyard, where she was finally completed  in April 1925.

Service history
After commissioning Keppel served on various stations in the inter-war period, in the Mediterranean and the Far East, before going into reserve in 1937. With war threatening she was re-commissioned in August 1939 and was stationed at Gibraltar as leader of 13th Destroyer Flotilla. In June 1940 she assisted in the evacuation of forces from France, and in Operation Catapult, the attack on the French Fleet at Mers el Kebir. 
Following this she was returned to Scapa Flow, joining 12th Destroyer Flotilla for fleet operations, such as assisting in fleet escort duty, offensive sweeps in home waters, and preparations to resist the expected German invasion.
 
In February 1941 she was deployed to the Western Approaches Escort Force for Atlantic convoy defence. She was designated as leader of 12th Escort Group, stationed at Londonderry.
In this role Keppel was engaged in all the duties performed by escort ships; protecting convoys, searching for and attacking U-boats which attacked ships in convoy, and rescuing survivors. In four years service Keppel escorted more than 30 North Atlantic and over a dozen Gibraltar convoys, of which six were attacked, with the loss of 20 ships (though several others were also lost as stragglers) and she was involved in four major convoy battles. In this Keppel ensured the safe and timely arrival of over 1000 ships, destroyed one U-boat and assisted in the destruction of two others.

She also operated on the Arctic convoy route, escorting 15 convoys to and from the Soviet Union. Most of these were attacked, several suffering heavy losses; during this time Keppel attacked and destroyed four U-boats.
 

In July 1942 Keppel was leader of the close escort for the ill-fated Arctic convoy PQ 17, which suffered heavy losses after the convoy was scattered.

In September 1942 she was part of the Distant Cover Force protecting PQ 18, and the returning QP 14, though the force was not directly involved in the fighting around them.

In early 1943 Keppel, now leading 3EG, returned to the Atlantic. 
In September 1943, Keppel was involved in the battle around ONS 18, which saw six ships and three escorts sunk, for the destruction of three U-boats. One of these, was attacked and destroyed by Keppel on the last day of the battle.
In January 1944 Keppel, now leading 8EG, returned to the Arctic convoy route. In February, with JW 57, she attacked and destroyed , one of two dispatched by the escort group.
On the return with RA 57, one ship was lost for the destruction of three U-boats and damage of two others.
In April 1944, with JW 58, Keppel rammed and sank , one of four U-boats destroyed in this action.
In summer 1944 Keppel transferred to the Channel for Operation Neptune, the naval operations supporting the Normandy landings. 
In August 1944, with JW 59, Keppel and other units attacked and destroyed , one of two accounted for, for the loss of one escort, . Returning with RA 59A, Keppel and other units attacked and destroyed .

In June 1945 Keppel was decommissioned and in July 1945 was sold off for breaking/to be scrapped.

Battle honours
During her service Keppel was awarded four battle honours:
Atlantic 1940–43
Malta convoys 1942
Arctic 1942–45
Normandy 1944

Successes
During her service Keppel was credited with the destruction of five U-boats, and assisted in the destruction of two others:

Notes

References
 
 Clay Blair : Hitler's U-Boat War Vol II: The Hunted 1942–1945 (1998) 
 
 
 
 Arnold Hague : The Allied Convoy System 1939–1945 (2000).  (Canada);  (UK).
 Paul Kemp  : U-Boats Destroyed  ( 1997) . 
 
 
Axel Neistle  : German U-Boat Losses during World War II  (1998). 
 
 Whitley, MH : Destroyers of World War Two (1988)

External links

 HMS Keppel at naval-history.net: retrieved 2 Feb 2015 
 HMS Keppel at uboat.net: retrieved 2 Feb 2015
HMS Keppel at britainsnavy.co.uk

 

Thornycroft type destroyer leaders
Ships built in Southampton
1920 ships
World War II destroyers of the United Kingdom
Ships built by John I. Thornycroft & Company